Aspra may refer to:

  Aspra, Sicily
 Aspra, Vima Mică, a village, part of Vima Mică
 Aspra Spitia, Elis
 Aspra Spitia, Viotia
 Aspra Sabina
 Aspra, a brand name for the drug omeprazole